The 2023 Temple Owls football team will represent Temple University in the 2023 NCAA Division I FBS football season. They will play their home games at Lincoln Financial Field in Philadelphia, Pennsylvania, and be led by second-year head coach Stan Drayton, competing as a member of the American Athletic Conference (The American).

Previous season 

The Owls finished the 2022 season 3–9, 1–7 in AAC play to finish 11th in the conference.

Preseason

Schedule

Personnel

Recruiting class
The following recruits and transfers have signed letters of intent or verbally committed to the Temple Owls football program for the 2023 recruiting year.

References

Temple
Temple Owls football seasons
2023 in sports in Pennsylvania